Rahimabad (also Romanized as Raḩīmābād) is a village in Garkan-e Shomali Rural District, Pir Bakran District, Falavarjan County, Isfahan Province, Iran. At the 2006 census, its population was 122, in 36 families.

References 

Populated places in Falavarjan County